The Christian Historical Union (CHU) was a Protestant Christian democratic political party in the Netherlands. The CHU is one of the predecessors of the Christian Democratic Appeal (CDA), into which it merged in September 1980.

Party history

History before 1908
In 1879, the Anti-Revolutionary Party (ARP) was founded by a group of orthodox reformed Protestants, who had split from the main Dutch Reformed Church to form the Reformed Churches in the Netherlands. It advocated equal funding for religious schools, universal suffrage and Protestant morality. Their main tactic was the anti-thesis between religious and non-religious parties, which meant that it sought to break the cooperation between liberals and Roman Catholics and to create an alliance between Catholics and Protestants. Furthermore, it was the first party with a strong centralised organisation – previously parties were organised as factions. The party was joined by many conservatives, who agreed with part of their program, many of whom were still members of the Dutch Reformed Church.

The Anti-Revolutionaries were rather successful, winning 13 (out of 100) seats in the House of Representatives in the 1879 election, although not all MPs who campaigned as "Anti-Revolutionaries" were members of the ARP. After the 1888 election, the party formed a coalition cabinet with Anti-Revolutionaries and Catholics. In the 1891 election, the Catholic–Protestant coalition lost its majority. A liberal cabinet was formed. The liberal minister Tak proposed drastic changes to the census, which would result practically in universal male suffrage. The ARP supported an enlarged franchise.

Several of these events caused considerable tension between the core of the ARP and the conservatives who supported them.
 These conservatives were opposed to Catholicism and dismissed the alliance between Catholics and Protestants; instead they wanted to form an alliance between Protestants, other conservatives and conservative liberals;
 The conservatives opposed the extension of suffrage, instead supporting divine sovereignty.
 They disagreed with the party having strong organisation and strong party discipline; instead they wanted to form a loose association of caucuses, with individualist MPs.
 Different views on the relationship between church and state formed the theoretic issue of contention between the groups; while the ARP adhered to sphere sovereignty, the conservatives advocated theocracy.
For these reasons, a group of conservatives led by Alexander de Savornin Lohman left the party. The group was composed of members of the Dutch Reformed Church, many of whom had an aristocratic background. In the 1894 election they ran on individual "free anti-revolutionary" tickets and formed a free anti-revolutionary faction in parliament with six members. In 1896 they set up a committee to found a new party. In the 1897 election the individual free anti-revolutionaries won five seats. The Christian Historical Voters' League, another dissenting anti-revolutionary party, also won a seat, taken by Dutch Reformed minister De Visser. In 1898 the free anti revolutionaries founded a separate party the Free Anti Revolutionary Party. In the 1901 elections the party won nine seats, four more than the five the free Anti Revolutionaries had won as individual candidates in 1897. The religious parties won a majority in this election, a cabinet was formed by ARP leader Kuyper, which the VAR supported without providing any ministers. The Frisian League, another dissenting anti revolutionary party also won one seat, taken by Dutch Reformed minister Schokking. In 1903 the VAR merged with the Christian Historical Voters' League to form the Christian Historical Party. In 1908 the Christian Historical Party merged with the Frisian League to found the Christian Historical Union.

1908–1945
Between 1908 and 1913 the CHU supported a minority confessional cabinet of ARP and the Catholic General League. In the 1909 election the party won 10 seats, two more than the CHP and Frisian League had won in 1905. In the 1913 election the party stayed stable. Between 1913 and 1918 the country was governed by an extra parliamentary cabinet formed by liberals. Its main goal was to implement a constitutional reform combining both male universal suffrage and equal payment for religious schools. At the end of the cabinets term, two CHU ministers joined the cabinet, as they were relatively neutral politicians.

In the 1918 elections, in which male universal suffrage and proportional representation were used for the first time, the party lost three seats. Together the ARP, CHU and the Catholic RKSP won fifty seats. The CHU started to cooperate fully in the confessional coalition. They formed a cabinet led by the Catholic Charles Ruijs de Beerenbrouck. The CHU provided only one minister (De Visser became minister of Education, Arts and Sciences) and two non-partisan sympathisers of the CHU were appointed. During the cabinet's term one CHU member, Dirk Jan de Geer and another CHU sympathiser were appointed as ministers, while the two CHU-sympathisers stepped down. In the 1922 election the party won four seats and the cabinet of Ruys de Beerenbrouck continued to govern, the CHU supplied two ministers and one non-partisan CHU-sympathiser is appointed. During the term one CHU minister, minister of finance De Geer, stepped down, after the budget of the ministry of the Navy is rejected. In the 1925 election the party remained stable at 11 seats. A party which is closely related to the CHU, the HGS, an orthodox version of the CHU, also won one seat. Another RKSP-ARP-CHU cabinet was formed, now led by Hendrikus Colijn; the CHU supplies to minister. In 1925 the cabinet fell prematurely because of a motion supported by the CHU parliamentary party. Each year the anti-Papist Reformed Political Party would propose a motion to remove the Dutch representative at the Holy See, (a symbolic motion to show their opposition to the Pope) which was supported by the CHU. In 1925 the left-liberal Free-thinking Democratic League and socialist Social Democratic Workers' Party supported this motion because they saw it as an opportunity to bring about the downfall of the cabinet and form a progressive coalition after the election. After lengthy formation talks an extra-parliamentary cabinet was formed, led by De Geer of the CHU, with one other CHU member appointed and one further CHU member joining during the cabinet's lifetime. De Geer was chosen because he was a reliable administrator and a less divisive figure. In the 1929 election the party remained stable at 11 seats. It cooperated in a new coalition cabinet led by Ruys de Beerenbrouck, supplying two ministers, with one CHU-sympathiser also serving as a minister.

After the 1933 election, in which the party lost one seat, another coalition cabinet led by Colijn was formed, which was joined by members of the liberal Free-thinking Democratic League and the Liberal State Party. The CHU supplied only one minister and a further CHU member was appointed minister during the cabinet's term, who left after a cabinet crisis. During the 1930s a groups of the party's younger members, including Piet Lieftinck begin to develop support for state intervention in the economy and form a Christian basis for this intervention on basis of the work of the theologian Karl Barth. In the 1937 election the party lost two additional seats, leaving eight. The party continued to govern in an ARP-RKSP-CHU coalition. In 1939 a national cabinet was formed with the SDAP and the three confessional parties. De Geer, as a reliable, respected administrator, led this cabinet. During World War II, De Geer's position becomes less tenable, as he attempted to negotiate a peace with the Germans against the will of the government. When the Dutch government went into exile he is replaced by ARP-member Pieter Sjoerds Gerbrandy and the CHU provided one minister in these cabinets in exile.

1945–1977
After the Second World War, prominent CHU politicians wanted to end the pillarisation of Dutch politics. Some wanted to unite the CHU with the ARP, others, like Piet Lieftinck, joined the new social democratic Labour Party (PvdA).

Between 1945 and 1948 the CHU was marginalised politically as the re-founded Catholic People's Party (KVP) rejected cooperation with the confessional parties in favour of cooperation with the re-founded social democratic Labour Party (PvdA). Some prominent progressive CHU-members left the CHU to join this new PvdA. It was kept out of the progressive Schermerhorn–Drees cabinet. In the 1946 elections it kept it eight seats, which it also had before the war. The CHU was also kept out of the first Beel cabinet which also just consisted of the KVP and PvdA.

After the 1948 election in which the party won one seat it was invited to join the cabinet again. It joined the broad basis cabinet Drees–Van Schaik cabinet which combined the KVP, PvdA, CHU and the conservative liberal VVD, that is every major party except for the Communist Party of the Netherlands and the Anti-Revolutionary Party. These parties were excluded because they opposed the major reforms the cabinets were implementing, including the welfare state, in the case of the CPN, and the decolonisation of the Dutch East Indies in the case of the ARP. The CHU endorsed both these policies, creating considerable conflict internally. The CHU parliamentary party in the Senate voted for the independence of Indonesia. The CHU provides one minister, which is expanded to two after a 1951 cabinet crisis. After the 1952 election a new cabinet was formed and the VVD was replaced by the ARP, while the CHU retained two ministers. In the 1956 election the party retained the same percentage of vote, but due to the expansion of parliament it gets 13 seats (out of 150). A new cabinet was formed with the same composition and the CHU retained its two ministers. In 1959 the cabinet fell prematurely. A caretaker cabinet was formed by ARP, KVP and CHU.

After the 1959 election in which the party lost one seat, the De Quay cabinet is formed by KVP, ARP, CHU and VVD. The CHU still supplied two ministers. After the 1963 elections, in which the CHU gained one seat, the cabinet continued. In 1965 this cabinet fell, and a new cabinet was formed, without the CHU and the VVD, but with the PvdA. This cabinet fell after one year. In the 1967 election campaign the ARP, CHU and KVP declare that will continue to govern together. The CHU lost one seat but still supplied two ministers in the new KVP-ARP-CHU-VVD coalition De Jong cabinet. During this period the differences between the ARP and CHU became more pronounced, with the ARP becoming more progressive and the CHU remaining more conservative. In the 1971 election the party's leader Udink made a fool out of himself by posing as a hippie: the party lost three seats. It joined a coalition cabinet of the same parties, now joined by the moderate Democratic Socialists '70, which broke away from the PvdA. The cabinet fell after one year. In the 1972 election campaign the CHU lost three seats, and was left with seven. Furthermore, CHU was blocked from the newly formed cabinet by the PvdA and its allies, which cooperated with the KVP and ARP.

Meanwhile, a process of merger had started between the KVP, ARP and CHU, under pressure of poor election results. In 1974 they found a federation called the Christian Democratic Appeal (CDA). In the 1977 election they campaigned together under the name of the CDA.

The power of the CHU current within the CDA is relatively small. Although there are some prominent CDA politicians with a background in the CHU, the better organised KVP and ARP are far stronger currents within the party.

Name
The CHU derived its name "Christian Historical Union" from its combination of conservatism, the orientation to that which has historically grown with Protestant Christianity. The label conservative was already taken by a parliamentary group of monarchists and colonialists, who fell from favour during the late 19th century. In its early years the terms anti-revolutionary and Christian-historical were used interchangeable. With the split between the Anti-Revolutionary Party and the CHU the terms began to gain their own separate meanings. Furthermore, the party styled itself a loose union of individual MPs and municipal caucuses and therefore used the term Union instead of party.

Ideology and issues
The CHU lacked a coherent political ideology as it was formed by politicians who emphasised their own independent position. Furthermore, many times it served as the counterpart of the ARP:
 Between 1908 and 1918, the party served as the more conservative of the two main Protestant parties. It was more anti-papal than the ARP, which was more oriented towards cooperation with Catholics. It was also more sceptical about universal suffrage.
 In the period 1918–1940, the differences between the ARP and CHU were mainly religious, with parties advocating similar policies, like a strong defence and fiscal conservatism. With the ARP representing the Reformed Churches in the Netherlands and the CHU conservative parts of the Dutch Reformed Church and other non-aligned churches. Arguably, the CHU inclined to be “both more sophisticated and (...) more dogmatic” than the ARP
 Between 1945 and 1960 the differences between the ARP and the CHU were focused on the issue of decolonisation of the Dutch East Indies: while the ARP was vehemently against this, the CHU was pragmatic about the issue. It presented itself as a "centre party" and was described in the media as such.
 In the 1960s and 1970s, the ARP became more progressive, while the CHU began to emphasise its conservatism. However it is interesting that the CHU did not embrace a specific political label as was emphasised in a rapport published in 1967 that described the party as being neither conservative, progressive, right-wing or left-wing, but a political party that wanted to serve all the people. The left wing of the party wanted the party to become a progressive party and close co-operation with the Labour Party and the other Christian Democratic parties; however, the majority of the party wanted to continue the centrist course.

Generally the political course of the party can be seen as (soft) conservative and Christian democratic. It saw the government as the servant of God and emphasised the special role of the Netherlands, with its history of Protestantism. The CHU had relatively constant positions on several issues:
 The party was conservative in social and ethical matters, rejecting divorce and protecting the position of religious schools. At the same time they supported public schools, believing they must be based on Christian principles. After the Second World War, it embraced a more socially progressive stand and supported the creation of a welfare state.
 The party took a strong position in favour of law and order, and it favoured the Dutch monarchy
 The party was fiscally conservative, combining support for the welfare state with tight budgetary controls.

Social wing
Although most CHU members of parliament were conservatives, some others were more moderate and belonged to the social wing of the party. The more socially oriented MP's were: Johan Reinhardt Snoeck Henkemans (1862–1945), Jan Rudolph Slotemaker de Bruïne (1869–1941), Frida Katz (1885–1963), Jouke Bakker (1873–1956), Piet Lieftinck (1902–1989), Henk Kikkert (1912–1988), Cor van Mastrigt (1909–1997), jkvr. Bob Wttewaall van Stoetwegen (1901–1986), Arnold Tilanus (1910–1996), Coos Huijsen (*1939), Ernst van Eeghen (1920–2007), Wim Deetman (*1945) and Nellien de Ruiter (1926–2000). The highly popular Jkvr. Bob Wttewaall van Stoetwegen, long-time member of parliament after the Second World War and befriended with the queen, was considered reasonably progressive on social issues (decolonisation of the Dutch Indies, women emancipation, housing, prison reforms, welfare), as was her colleague, the unionist, Henk Kikkert (welfare, housing).

Organisation

Leaders

Leadership 

 Chairman
 Alexander de Savornin Lohman (9 July 1908 – 11 May 1910)
 Johannes de Visser (11 May 1910 – 12 September 1918)
 Jan Schokking (12 September 1918 – 4 Augustus 1925)
 Jan Rudolph Slotemaker de Bruïne (4 Augustus 1925 – 11 March 1927)
 Jan de Schokking (11 March 1927 – 1 March 1932)
 Jan Rudolph Slotemaker de Bruïne (1 March 1932 – 30 June 1933)
 Dirk Jan de Geer (30 June 1933 – 10 Augustus 1939)
 Hendrik Tilanus (10 Augustus 1939 – 9 July 1958)
 Henk Beernink (9 July 1958 – 19 March 1966)
 Arnold Tilanus (19 March 1966 – 5 October 1968)
 Johan van Hulst (5 October 1968 – 19 February 1972)
 Otto van Verschuer (19 February 1972 – 19 November 1977)
 Luck van Leeuwen (19 November 1977 – 11 October 1980)

Representation
This table shows the CHU's results in elections to the House of Representatives, Senate and States-Provincial, as well as the party's political leadership: the fractievoorzitter, is the chair of the parliamentary party and the lijsttrekker is the party's top candidate in the general election, these posts are normally taken by the party's leader. If the party is in government, a high ranking minister, often the prime minister can also be party leader. If the high ranking minister is the Prime Minister, this can be seen by the "PM" behind his name. If he is in the cabinet without support of his party his is listed as "independent". The party's membership is also presented in this figure.

* Independent but sympathiser of the CH

Municipal and provincial government
The party was particularly strong in rural municipal and provincial governments. The party performed well in Friesland, Overijssel, Utrecht and Zeeland. The Western part of Friesland and the islands Zuid-Beveland and Walcheren and the island Marken were the party's stronghold.

In the following figure one can see the election results of the provincial election of 1931 per province. It shows the areas where the CHU is strong, namely the Protestant rural provinces, the party is very weak in catholic provinces.

Electorate
The electorate of the CHU has seen three decisive shifts, especially in its relation with the ARP, the other Protestant party. Although dates are given here, the changes were gradual
Between 1908 and 1917 the CHU appealed to the aristocracy, the people with double names, nobility, land owners, high officers and high-ranking civil servants, who opposed universal suffrage.
Between 1917 and 1967 the CHU appealed to members of the Dutch Reformed Church.
Between 1967 and 1977, in the time of secularisation and depillarisation the party retained its conservative image.

Organisation

National organisation
The party had a federal organisation with strong local branches and an independent parliamentary party, without party discipline.

Linked organisations
The party published the magazine "C.H. Nederlander" ("Christian Historical Dutchman"). Its youth organisation was the Christelijk-Historische Jongeren Organisatie (English: Christian Historical Youth Organisation Anti-Revolutionary Youth Studyclubs). Its scientific institute was the De Savornin Lohman foundation.

International organisations
Internationally the CHU was a relatively isolated party. In the European Parliament its members sat in the Christian Democratic faction.

Pillarised organisations
The party had weak ties to many Protestant organisations, such as the Dutch Reformed Church, the Protestant broadcaster NCRV, the employers' organisation NCW, the trade union CNV and the Christian Farmers' Organisation. Together these organisations formed the Protestant pillar, over which the Anti-Revolutionary Party had far more control than the CHU. Rather than use a pillar, the CHU appealed to unaffiliated conservative Protestants. The party did own its own newspaper, De Nederlander.

Although the CHU didn't have a separate party organisation for women, several women did play an important role within the party and in parliament, like jkvr. Christine Wttewaall van Stoetwegen, who served as a member of the House of Representatives from 1945 till 1971 and was one of the most popular politicians in the Netherlands in the 1960s. Another female member of the House of Representatives was Dr. Frida Katz, who was elected in 1922 and remained a member of parliament after she was married (1937) with baron Mackay and finally resigned as MP in 1941.

Relationships to other parties
The party's primary ally was the Anti-Revolutionary Party, and through that party it got involved in the coalition with the Catholic parties (General League/RKSP/KVP), although it was opposed to Catholicism as a religion.

International comparison
As a party for Protestant dissenters of a catholic-Protestant alliance the CHU is a unique phenomenon in international perspective. Its political course which included support of limited government, rejection of universal suffrage and hostility against Catholicism, is comparable to the course of the British Conservative Party in the late 19th century and to some extent American Party of the United States.

As a conservative Protestant party, the CHU is very similar to the Scandinavian Christian Democrats (such as the Swedish, Norwegian, Danish and the Finnish Christian Democrats), they are all socially and fiscally conservative, with a social heart. All have their roots in orthodox tendencies within the national church. It also shared similarities in its conservative policy with the current policies of the UK Conservatives (the paternalistic conservative wing of that party, laying much emphasis on the responsibility of the well off to help the less fortunate, without really changing the social fabric of society). Comparing the CHU to an American party is more difficult, but it seemed somewhat close to the moderate wing of the US Republicans (Unlike the US Republicans the CHU was non-egalitarian, rejecting social mobility. - It would also have strongly disliked the current extremist trend within that party.) or the conservative wing of the US Democratic Party.

The Left-wing of the CHU held similar ideas as the "Red Tory" (or One-nation conservative) faction within the UK Conservative Party, advocating a limited social welfare state combined with a not too big government and adherence to the monarchy and traditional institutions.

Further reading

Notes and references

Defunct political parties in the Netherlands
Protestant political parties
Confessional parties in the Netherlands
Political parties established in 1908
Political parties disestablished in 1980
Defunct Christian political parties
1908 establishments in the Netherlands
Conservative parties in the Netherlands
Monarchist parties in the Netherlands